Euskal Herriko Alderdi Sozialista (EHAS) was an illegal revolutionary socialist Basque political party, with presence in both Spanish Basque Country and the French Basque Country.

History
EHAS was formed as the merge of the Spanish-Basque Eusko Alderdi Sozialista and the French-Basque Herriko Alderdi Sozialista, being the first Basque party with presence at both sides of the border. The party participated in various unitary movements, like Euskal Erakunde Herritarra (coordination body of both independentist and non-independentist Basque socialists and communists) and the Koordinadora Abertzale Sozialista. The party also signed the Brest Charter in 1975.

In 1977 the party merged with Eusko Sozialistak, a small socialist party critical with ETA(m), to create Herri Alderdi Sozialista Iraultzailea (HASI). In Iparralde the party continued to exist, and presented candidacies to various elections. Manex Goyhenetche was the French-Basque leader of the party, that maintained a strong relationship with the Breton Democratic Union.

References

Casanova, Iker and Asensio, Paul (2006). Argala. Tafalla (Navarre): Editorial Txalaparta. .

1975 establishments in Spain
Political parties in the Basque Country (autonomous community)
Basque nationalism
Communist parties in France
Communist parties in Spain
Defunct communist parties in the Basque Country (autonomous community)
Political parties established in 1975